Asperula gussonei, also known as alpine woodruff, is a deciduous species of perennial groundcover, and a flowering plant in the family Rubiaceae. It was first described in 1831 and is endemic to Sicily.

Description
Asperula gussonei appears as a small green moss-like plant, with small (1in) stemless pale pink flowers, it has a compact cushion of small, dark green, needle-like, leaves.

Growth cycle
Asperula gussonei flowers around May-June, and grows best in a rock garden, trough or crevice.

History
Alpine woodruff was first named by Pierre Edmond Boissier

References

gussonei
Taxa named by Pierre Edmond Boissier
Flora of Sicily